Niver Arboleda Díaz (8 December 1967 – 5 October 2011) was a Colombian footballer who played for Atlético Nacional, Deportivo Cali, Veracruz, Zacatepec and Zhejiang Greentown.

Club career
Born in Puerto Tejada, Cauca, Arboleda began playing football at the Carlos Sarmiento Lora School. He turned professional with Atlético Nacional, where he would win the 1989 Copa Libertadores. Next, he made 147 league appearances for Deportivo Cali before moving abroad to play for Tiburones Rojos de Veracruz in the Mexican Primera División. After one season in Veracruz, he played for second division sides Zacatepec and Real Sociedad de Zacatecas. He finished his career playing in Guatemala with Antigua GFC and Juventud Retalteca.

International career
Arboleda also won four caps for Colombia with two of them coming in the 1995 Copa America.

Personal
Arboleda died from a heart attack during a surgical procedure at a Guatemala City hospital at age 43.

References

External links

1967 births
2011 deaths
Colombian footballers
Colombia international footballers
1995 Copa América players
Categoría Primera A players
Atlético Nacional footballers
Deportivo Cali footballers
C.D. Veracruz footballers
Club Atlético Zacatepec players
Real Sociedad de Zacatecas footballers
Zhejiang Professional F.C. players
Antigua GFC players
Colombian expatriate footballers
Expatriate footballers in Mexico
Expatriate footballers in China
Expatriate footballers in Guatemala
Association football forwards
Sportspeople from Cauca Department